Dypterygia is a genus of moths of the family Noctuidae.

Description
Its eyes are naked and without eyelashes. The proboscis is fully formed. Palpi upturned reaching above vertex of head, where the second joint with long hair below. Antennae minutely ciliated in male. Thorax with a long furrowed crest behind the collar. Abdomen with dorsal tufts on proximal segments. Tibia spineless.

Species
 Dypterygia andreji (Kardakoff, 1928)
 Dypterygia assuetus (Butler, 1879)
 Dypterygia caliginosa (Walker, 1858)
 Dypterygia cristifera Hampson, 1893
 Dypterygia dolens (Druce, 1909)
 Dypterygia fuscocana Strand, 1920
 Dypterygia ligata (Möschler, 1891)
 Dypterygia lignaris (Schaus, 1898)
 Dypterygia multistriata Warren, 1912
 Dypterygia nicea (Swinhoe, 1901)
 Dypterygia ordinarius (Butler, 1879)
 Dypterygia pallida Dognin, 1907
 Dypterygia patina (Harvey, 1875)
 Dypterygia punctirena (Walker, 1857)
 Dypterygia rozmani Berio, 1974
 Dypterygia scabriuscula (Linnaeus, 1758)
 Dypterygia subfusca (Wileman, 1912)

References

Hadeninae